Yasser Shaheen (born in Homs) is a Syrian footballer, who currently play for Al-Shabab SC (Seeb) in the Oman Professional League.

International career
Shaheen is currently a member of the Syrian Senior national team and the Syrian U-23 national team.
He was a part of the Syrian U-23 national team in the Mediterranean Games 2009 in Italy and he scored one goal against Italy U20 in the first match of the group-stage.

Appearances in major competitions

Appearances for Senior National Team

Honour and titles

Club
Al-Karamah
Syrian Premier League : 2009
Syrian Cup : 2009, 2010
AFC Cup: 2009 Runner-up

External links
 
 Career stats at goalzz.com
 Career stats at Kooora.com (Arabic)
 Profile at alkarameh.com

Living people
1989 births
Syrian footballers
Al-Karamah players
Churchill Brothers FC Goa players
Association football defenders
Sportspeople from Homs
Syria international footballers
Syrian expatriate footballers
Syrian expatriate sportspeople in Bahrain
Syrian expatriate sportspeople in Lebanon
Syrian people of Lebanese descent
Sportspeople of Lebanese descent
Syrian Premier League players
Competitors at the 2009 Mediterranean Games
Mediterranean Games competitors for Syria
Expatriate footballers in India
I-League players